The Writer's Block is an independent bookseller, publisher, and literacy educator in downtown Las Vegas.

The Writer's Block was established in 2014 by 826NYC co-founder Scott Seeley and Drew Cohen. It was opened with former BSSco. store manager and Archway Editions publisher Chris Molnar.  It is the first independent bookstore in Las Vegas, and second in the state of Nevada.

Behind the bookstore front at the original Fremont St. location was the literacy education component of the Writer's Block, known as Codex.  Similar in layout to the educational area behind 826NYC's Superhero Supply Store, Codex also featured movable walls, tables and desks.  It was used for free writing workshops for children ages 5-18, in addition to readings, signings, and ongoing series such as Neon Lit, the monthly reading by MFA and PHD writing students at UNLV.

In 2019, the Writer's Block relocated to the Lucy, a new art center in downtown Las Vegas.

References

External links
Official website
The Writer's Block Residencies

Independent bookstores of the United States
Downtown Las Vegas
Buildings and structures in Las Vegas
Retail buildings in Nevada
Creative writing programs
Education in Las Vegas
Bookstores established in the 21st century
American companies established in 2014
Publishing companies established in 2014
Retail companies established in 2014
2014 establishments in Nevada
Tourist attractions in the Las Vegas Valley